General elections were held for the first time in the Palestinian territories on 20 January 1996 to elect the President of the Palestinian National Authority (PNA) and members of the Palestinian Legislative Council (PLC), the legislative arm of the PNA. They took place in the West Bank, Gaza Strip, and East Jerusalem. Following the elections, a government was formed, headed by the President of the Palestinian National Authority, Yasser Arafat.

Background
The 1996 elections took place in a moment of optimism in the Israeli–Palestinian peace process, and many Palestinians believed that the government they were electing would be the first of an independent Palestinian state. However, in the ensuing months and years, Israelis and Palestinians failed to resolve their differences and come to a final status agreement, and an upswing in violence meant that the Israeli–Palestinian conflict would continue. As a result of this instability, new presidential and legislative elections were not held until nearly a decade later.

There were no real strong conventional political parties in place before the election. The results were dominated by Fatah, the strongest movement within the Palestine Liberation Organization, which was headed by Yassir Arafat. The Islamist Hamas, Fatah's main rival, refused to participate in the election; they felt that doing so would lend legitimacy to the PNA, which was created out of what they called unacceptable negotiations and compromises with Israel. Independent international observers reported the elections to have been free and fair; however, boycotts by Hamas and opposition movements limited voter choices.

Opinion polls

Presidential

Legislative

Conduct
Despite considerable Israeli obstruction, the PCBS was able to arrange the necessary voter registration. Obstructions included long delays in providing maps and necessary information, insistence on Hebrew-only documents; "... They did all they could to hinder things in Jerusalem .."; in Gaza, six tons of voter registration cards were held up at the Erez crossing, and eventually they had to be passed "by hand over the concrete barriers that surround the checkpoint".

Results

President
The president was elected by a simple popular vote.  The results of the election were considered a foregone conclusion by most observers, due to Arafat's longtime dominance of the Palestinian political scene (he had been PNA president since its creation and head of the PLO for decades before that) and the high regard he was held in by most Palestinians; his only opponent was female politician Samiha Khalil largely considered a prop. Arafat won the election with 88.2 percent of the vote to Khalil's 11.5 percent.

Legislative Council
The legislative election saw 88 PLC members elected from multi-member constituencies, with the number of representatives from each constituency determined by population. Some seats were set aside for the Christian and Samaritan communities. 51 seats were allocated to the West Bank, 37 to the Gaza Strip. Of the 25 female candidates, five won seats; Hanan Ashrawi, Dalal Salameh, Jamila Saidam, Rawya Shawa and Intissar al-Wazir.

Analysis
Elections in the OPT are held to exercise the Palestinian right to self-determination in connection with their right to establish their own state, but are held within the context of the Israeli occupation. They are held in the framework of the Oslo Accords, meaning that the power of the PNA was (and is) limited to matters such as culture, education, ID cards and the distribution of the land and water.

A controversial claim has been made, that changes of the political reality, including elections and the formation of new political entities under occupation are, like the Oslo Accords themselves, contrary to the Geneva Conventions and thus illegal. This argument is generally not accepted, as the Accords were meant as a temporary stepping stone to Palestinian self-determination.
Some view elections in the Palestinian Territories as little more than symbolic, given the limited power they grant.

Political freedom is limited in the Palestinian Territories; checkpoints and separation walls are already fit to hinder all social activities. The parliament cannot function, merely because free travel is not possible, especially between Gaza and West Bank. In addition to this, hostilities between Fatah and Hamas hinder the correct functioning of the parliament.

Moreover, PNA and parliament do not represent the Palestinian diaspora (to which the PLO is entitled).

References

External links
Palestinian Central Elections Commission

Palestinian
Elections in the Palestinian National Authority
General
Election and referendum articles with incomplete results